The Apolobamba Integrated Management Natural Area (Área Natural de Manejo Integrado Apolobamba) is a protected area in the La Paz Department, Bolivia, situated in the Bautista Saavedra, Franz Tamayo and Larecaja  provinces.

See also 
 Apolobamba
 Ulla Ulla National Reserve

References

External links 
 www.parkswatch.org / Apolobamba Integrated Management Natural Area

Protected areas of Bolivia
Geography of La Paz Department (Bolivia)
Protected areas established in 1972
1972 establishments in Bolivia